Econometric Reviews is a scholarly econometrics journal. It is published six times per year.

Its editor is Esfandiar Maasoumi.

References 

Econometrics journals